Victor Huang Wei-de (born 21 October 1971) is a Taiwanese actor and singer.

Biography
Huang started his career as a singer. In 2000 he joined Phoenix Talent Company (鳳凰藝能) and acted in many television dramas produced by Chinese Television System and Formosa Television. In late 2004, Huang starred as the male lead character Kong Lifu in Moment in Peking, a Chinese television series based on Lin Yutang's novel of the same title. In 2006 Huang became an artist under Chinese talent agency Huayi Brothers.

Filmography

Film

Television

Discography

Albums

References

External links
 
 
  Victor Huang on Sina.com

1971 births
Living people
Taiwanese male film actors
Male actors from Taipei
Musicians from Taipei
Taiwanese male television actors
20th-century Taiwanese male actors
21st-century Taiwanese male actors